227 was a year in the Julian calendar.

227 may also refer to:

 227 (number), properties and uses of the number
 227 (TV series), a sitcom that aired on NBC in the United States from 1985 to 1990
 227 series, a DC EMU train operated by West Japan Railway Company

See also
 227 BC
 List of highways numbered 227